Luis de Carvajal (c. 1500 – ?) was a Spanish Franciscan theologian of the Council of Trent.

Life

Of the noble family of Carvajal in Baetica, Carvajal at an early age was sent to the University of Paris, where he completed his studies. Having entered the Franciscan Order, he taught theology at Paris, whence he was sent as legate of Cardinal Angelus to the Council of Trent.

During the fifth session, in which the doctrine of original sin was discussed, Carvajal addressed the Council in favour of the Immaculate Conception, in defending which he had already won fame at Paris; it was doubtless owing to him that the Council inserted the words beginning "Declarat tamen" at the end of the fifth canon of this session.

Works
Carvajal was at Antwerp in 1548, at which time he brought out the third edition of his "Theologicarum sententiarum liber singularis". Besides this work, he is the author of the "Declamatio expostulatoria pro immaculatâ conceptione" (Paris, 1541) and of a defence of the religious orders against Erasmus, entitled "Apologia monasticae professionis" (Antwerp, 1529).

References

16th-century Spanish Roman Catholic theologians
Spanish Franciscans
Participants in the Council of Trent